The United States Hockey League (USHL) is the top junior ice hockey league sanctioned by USA Hockey. The league consists of 16 active teams located in the Midwestern United States, for players between the ages of 16 and 21. The USHL is strictly amateur, allowing former players to compete in NCAA college hockey.

The Chicago Steel won the Anderson Cup as the 2020–21 regular season champions and the 2021 Clark Cup playoff championship; both were their second in franchise history.

Operations
The USHL is the country's top sanctioned junior hockey league, classified as Tier I. Like comparable entities such as the Canadian Hockey League's (CHL) three member leagues, the USHL offers a schedule of high-level, competitive games for top players aged 16 to 20. Unlike the CHL, it does not pay a stipend to its players, who thus retain amateur status and are eligible to play in the NCAA.

Teams are subject to strict roster rules. In 2017–18 they may have no more than four overage skaters (players who have turned 20 in the first year of the season) and are limited to a maximum of five import players, three international players and two Canadian skaters. Starting in 2018–19, non-American goaltenders will count as two import players in a move designed to give more development time to American goalies, who are also exempt from the overage rule.

USHL teams, typically located in mid-sized cities, pay for all uniforms and equipment. Players live with local families, who receive a small stipend for food expenses, and either continue school or work part-time jobs. Due to their schedules, more than 90% of games are on weekends, which many NHL and college scouts attend. Average attendance at regular season games for the 2014–15 season was 2,715 with 1,384,820 fans attending games during the season.

Kyle Woodlief of Red Line Report stated in 2007 that the USHL's first line players are as good as their counterparts in the CHL—historically an important producer of NHL players—but that the Canadian-based league has better third and fourth lines. In 2006, Trevor Lewis, the 17th pick in the NHL Entry Draft, was the first USHL player to sign an NHL contract immediately after playing in the league..

At the conclusion of the 2014–15 regular season, the USHL has tallied 251 Alumni that have played in the NHL and has 347 current players with NCAA College Commitments. According to the league, approximately 95 percent of its players will eventually land a Division I college scholarship.

On March 18, 2020, the USHL cancelled the rest of 2019–20 season and playoffs as a result of the COVID-19 pandemic. The start of the following season was delayed to November 2020 and some teams had to suspend operations for the 2020–21 season.

Draft
The USHL Draft is an annual event conducted in two "phases" during the second week of May. The first phase is an eight-round draft of U-17 players for the upcoming season. The second phase of the draft is open to all players eligible to play junior hockey who are not already protected by a USHL team. The number of players drafted varies, as each team will draft until they have filled the 45 spots available on their roster. Undrafted players are open to try out for any team as a try-out player. Each team must reduce their roster to 23 players for the start of the season, but may carry 18 additional players on an affiliate list.

Teams

Current teams

Defunct professional teams

Junior league timeline

History
Precursors to this league were:
American Amateur Hockey League (1947–52)
Central Hockey League (1952–53)
Minnesota Hockey League (1953–55)
United States Central Hockey League (1955–61)

American Amateur Hockey League
The United States Hockey League was established as the American Amateur Hockey League in 1947 and began play for the 1947–48 season. When the league began operations it had five teams in and around the Twin Cities arena along with a team in Rochester. The league was made up three clubs from St. Paul which were 7-Up, Koppy's and Tally's, and two from Minneapolis, Jersey's and Bermans, along with a team from Rochester called the Rochester Mustangs. After the 1947–48 season the St. Paul Tally's dropped out of the league and left the five remaining members to make up the league for the 1948–49 and 1949–50 seasons. For the 1950–51 season the St. Paul 7-Up and St. Paul Koppy's merged and became St. Paul 7-Up/Koppy's. The Minneapolis Bermans dropped out of the league and new team called the Twin City Fords were added to give the American Amateur Hockey League four teams for 1950–51 season. The Rochester Mustangs were the only club to return for the fifth and final season of the American Amateur Hockey League in 1951–52. Gone were the St. Paul 7-Up/Koppy's, Twin City Fords and the Minneapolis Jerseys, replaced by the St. Paul Saints, Hibbing Flyers, Minneapolis Millers, Eveleth Rangers and the first club based outside of the state of Minnesota, the Sioux City Iowa Sunhawks, which gave the league six clubs for 1951–52, its final season as the American Amateur Hockey League.

Central Hockey League
The American Amateur Hockey League was renamed the Central Hockey League for the 1952–53 season. Only five of the clubs who had made up the American Amateur Hockey League for 1951–52 season returned. Those clubs were the Rochester Mustangs, St. Paul Saints, Minneapolis Millers, Hibbing Flyers and the now called Eveleth-Virginia Rangers. Gone were the Sioux City Sunhawks.

Minnesota Hockey League
After a year as the Central Hockey League the league was renamed the Minnesota Hockey League and would be called this for the 1953–54 and 1954–55 seasons. Only two teams who had made up the Central Hockey League returned to make up the Minnesota Hockey League for the 1953–54 season. Those teams were the Rochester Mustangs and the Hibbing Flyers. Gone were the St. Paul Saints, Minneapolis Millers and the Eveleth-Virginia Rangers. The Grand Forks Red Wings were added and this gave the league three teams for 1953–54 season. The Rochester Mustangs were the only team to return for the second and final season of the Minnesota Hockey League. Gone were Hibbing and Grand Forks. The league added two teams in Minneapolis called the Culbersons and Bungalows and a new team in St. Paul, again called the Saints, to give the league four teams for 1954–55.

United States Central Hockey League
After two seasons as the Minnesota Hockey League the league became the United States Central Hockey League and would be called this for five years, 1956 to 1960. Only three of the four teams who had made up the Minnesota Hockey League for the 1954–55 season returned. Those teams were the Rochester Mustangs along with both Minneapolis clubs, the Culbersons and the Bungalows. Gone were the St. Paul Saints who replaced by a team called the St. Paul Peters. These four clubs would make up the USCHL for the 1955–56 and 1956–57 seasons. For the 1957–58 season the St Paul Peters were replaced by a team called St. Paul K.S.T.P. The Rochester Mustangs were the only team to return for the 1958–59 season. Gone were St. Paul K.S.T.P. along with both Minneapolis clubs (the Culbersons and the Bungalows). The league returned to four teams when it replaced these clubs with the St. Paul Capitols, Minneapolis Millers and the Des Moines Ice Hawks, marking the league's return to Iowa. For the fifth and final season of the USCHL the St Paul Capitols dropped out and the league expanded to five teams and into new territory with a team in Michigan with the addition of the Marquette Sentinels and into Wisconsin with the addition of the Green Bay Bobcats.

1961–79
The United States Hockey League (USHL) operated as a senior ice hockey league 1961 to 1979.

The USHL welcomed the first female professional hockey player in 1969–70, when the Marquette Iron Rangers signed Karen Koch.

By the late 1970s, the USHL had fallen on hard times. In the summer of 1977, clubs from the recently folded Midwest Junior Hockey League contacted the USHL. A unique merger was formed, with the three junior teams (Bloomington Junior Stars, Austin Mavericks, St. Paul Vulcans) and three remaining pro teams (Sioux City Musketeers, Waterloo Black Hawks, Green Bay Bobcats) gathered under the USHL banner. League governors decided on a two-division format, with the junior-aged teams in the Midwest Division and the professionals in the U.S. Division. The teams played an interlocking schedule that was, predictably, dominated by the professionals. The USHL's split existence would last just two seasons. The minor-pro wing of the league folded following the 1978–79 season, providing junior hockey operators with the opportunity to redefine the circuit. The 1979–80 season was the league's first as an entirely junior arrangement.

The league's last season as a senior hockey league was 1978–79. During this final season the league comprised seven teams in two conferences. The U.S. Conference (with the Green Bay Bobcats, the Sioux City Musketeers and the Waterloo Black Hawks); while the Midwest Conference (with the Anoka Nordiques, the Austin Mavericks, the Bloomington Junior Stars and the St. Paul Vulcans). All seven teams were made up with players categorized as "Senior Amateur".  Following the 1978–79 season the senior league teams in the U.S. Conference folded and the USHL became an all-junior league the following season.

Awards

Semi-Pro Champions
Championships from the semi-pro era of the USHL.

Anderson Cup Champions
Regular season champions from junior era of the USHL.

Clark Cup Champions
Playoff champions from the junior era of the USHL.

Alumni
List of USHL alumni to play in the NHL
List of USHL players drafted by NHL teams

League records

Team
Most points in a season – 98 by Green Bay Gamblers in 2011–12 and Dubuque Fighting Saints in 2012–13. 
Most wins in a season – 48 by Des Moines Buccaneers in 1998–99 season.
Most losses in a season – 48 by Omaha Lancers in 1986–87 season.
Most road wins in a season – 25 by Green Bay Gamblers in 2011–12 season.
Longest winning streak – 19 by Des Moines Buccaneers between November 1, 1998 and January 6, 1999.

Individual
Most points in a season – 135 by Tim Ferguson of Sioux City Musketeers in 1985–86 season.
Most goals in a season – 67 by Rod Taylor of Sioux City Musketeers in 1986–87 season.
Most assists in a season – 79 by Tim Ferguson of Sioux City Musketeers in 1985–86 season.
Most PIMs in a season – 316 by Chad Stauffacher of Green Bay Gamblers in 1996–97 season.

See also
List of USHL seasons
List of ice hockey leagues
List of sports attendance figures

References

USHL 2006–07 Media Guide

External links
 USHL website
 Semi-Pro season standings 1947–1960
 Semi-Pro season standings 1961–1979
 Amateur season standings 1979–2007
 USHL Team Logos 1961–1979
 History of former USHL member Green Bay Bobcats
 History of former USHL member St. Paul/Twin City Vulcans

 
1
1947 establishments in the United States
Sports leagues established in 1947